All Saints’ Church, Hockley, originally known as All Saints’ Church, Nineveh, is a former Church of England parish church in Birmingham.

History
The church was designed by Thomas Rickman and Henry Hutchinson and was a Commissioners' church built on land given by Sir Thomas Gooch. It was consecrated on 28 September 1833 by the Bishop of Worcester.

A parish was assigned out of St Martin in the Bull Ring in 1834. All Saints’ Schools were built in 1843, with a contribution from the Queen Dowager of £20 and these buildings still exist on All Saints Street in Hockley.

A mission church was established in 1887 which became St Chrysostom’s Church, Hockley.

The church was enlarged in 1881, and demolished in 1966.

Organ
The church had a pipe organ by J.C. Banfield and Son which was opened on Sunday 26 March 1843. A specification of the organ can be found on the National Pipe Organ Register. When All Saints’ closed, the organ was moved to Lyndon Methodist Church

References

Church of England church buildings in Birmingham, West Midlands
Churches completed in 1833
Commissioners' church buildings
All Saints